The 16 October 1973 raid on Egyptian missile bases was an Israeli raid that took place during the Yom Kippur War. Conducted by the Israel Defense Forces' 421st brigade, its goal was the creation of a corridor in the dense Egyptian air defense array, thus allowing Israeli Air Force activity in the vicinity of the Suez Canal. Egyptian military forces were significantly weakened in the operation due to the destruction of several tanks and three missile bases. According to Israeli claims Israeli forces did not sustain any losses in personnel or equipment.

External links
 The story of the raid on 421st Brigade website
 The commanders debrief on 421st Brigade website

References

Battles of the Yom Kippur War